A referendum on reducing the term length of Parliament from five to four years was held in the Cook Islands on 7 September 2004. It followed a referendum on the same subject in 1999 that was approved by a majority of voters, but not the two-thirds required to be passed. The proposal would amend article 37 of the constitution, which at the time read  "The Queen's Representative shall dissolve Parliament at the expiration of 5 years from the date of the last preceding general election, if it has not sooner been dissolved." The change was approved by 82.27% of voters, passing the two-thirds threshold.

Results

References

2004 in the Cook Islands
2004 referendums
Referendums in the Cook Islands
September 2004 events in Oceania